Tall (also Romanized as Tal) is a village in Howmeh Rural District, in the Central District of Shahrud County, Semnan Province, Iran. According to the 2006 census, the population of the village comprised 193 persons and 69 families.

References 

Populated places in Shahrud County